Autumn Days is a 1963 Mexican drama film directed by Roberto Gavaldón, starring Pina Pellicer and Ignacio López Tarso. It is based on the story "Frustration" by B. Traven. Pellicer received the Best Actress award at the 1964 Mar del Plata International Film Festival.

Cast
 Pina Pellicer as Luisa
 Ignacio López Tarso as Albino
 Adriana Roel as Alicia
 Luis Lomelí as Carlos
 Graciela Doring as Empleada de pastelería
 Hortensia Santoveña as Doctora
 Eva Calvo as Cliente de pastelería
 Guillermo Orea as Fotógrafo
 Enrique García Álvarez as Cura
 Ricardo Fuentes as Dibujante

References

1963 drama films
1963 films
Films based on works by B. Traven
Films directed by Roberto Gavaldón
Spanish drama films
1960s Spanish-language films
Mexican drama films
1960s Mexican films